This article is a List of gondola lifts around the world.  A gondola lift has cabins suspended from a continuously circulating cable whereas aerial trams simply shuttle back and forth on cables.  (Both are cable cars, and both are aerial lifts which also includes chairlifts.) For aerial tramways, see the List of aerial tramways. For funitels, see the Funitel article.

(Note: this list should not contain aerial tramways or chairlifts.)

Africa

Algeria
 5 Cableways in Algiers the capital.
 The Constantine Cable Car, linking the two parts of Constantine.
 Oran Cableway, Oran.
 Annaba Cableway, Annaba.
 Skikda Cableway, Skikda.
 Telemcen Cableway, Telemcen.

South Africa
Hartbeespoort, North West - Gondola above Hartebeespoort Dam - Hartbeespoort Aerial Cableway
 Gondola in the National Zoological Gardens of South Africa, Pretoria

Egypt
Ain Sokhna-Gondola above El Sokhna

Asia

Mainland China

 Access to mountain tops of Zhangjiajie National Forest Park in Hunan
 Access to between the two higher altitude mountain tops of Mount Tai in Shandong
 Huangshan has three cable cars going up the mountain: the Eastern Trail's Yungu Si cable car, The Western Trail's Yuping cable car, and Taiping cable car

Hong Kong
 Ocean Park, Hong Kong Island - Cable car from Nam Long Shan Headland to Wong Chuk Hang within the Park
 Lantau Island - Ngong Ping 360, a 5.7 km cableway from MTR Tung Chung station to Ngong Ping Terminals near Po Lin Monastery. The cableway is part of the Ngong Ping 360 project.

India

 The Girnar ropeway in Junagadh, Gujarat, is Asia's longest ropeway.
 The Gulmarg Gondola in Jammu and Kashmir , one of the highest in Asia 
 The Naina Devi Gondola in the state of Himachal Pradesh
 The Mansa Devi gondola in Haridwar
 Maa Sharada temple ropeway in Maihar Madhya Pradesh, India.
 The Darjeeling Ropeway Gondola at Darjeeling in West Bengal
 The Timber Trail at Parwanoo in Himachal Pradesh
 The Solang Valley Ropeway near Manali, Himachal Pradesh
 The under-construction Dharamshala ropeway connecting Dharamshala and Mcleodganj, in Himachal Pradesh
 The Vaity Ropeway Resort, Saputara, Gujarat
 The Joshimath - Auli Ropeway, Auli
 The Dhuan Dhaar Ropeway, Jabalpur in Madhya Pradesh
 The Ropeway Over Gangtok City in Sikkim
 The Naini Jheel from the Ropeway, Nainital
 The Khotala Ropeway
 The Kolkata Sciene City Ropeway in Kolkata
 The Mussoorie Ropeway in Mussoorie
 The Udaipur Ropeway, Udaipur
 The Ropeway Ride in Rajgir, Bihar
 The Ambaji ropeway in Ambaji, Gujarat
 The Malampuzha Udan Khatola in Malampuzha, Kerala
 The Raigad Ropeway in Maharashtra
 Jakhu Ropeway, Shimla
 Deoghar Ropeway, Jharkhand
 Dongargarh Ropeway in Chhattisgarh
 Glenmorgan Ropeway, Tamil Nadu
 Srisailam Ropeway, Andhra Pradesh-Telangana
 Patnitop Ropeway, Jammu and Kashmir

Indonesia
 Ancol Jakarta Bay City, Jakarta
 Kumala Island, Tenggarong
 Guci Cable Car, Tegal
 Taman Mini Indonesia Indah, Jakarta
 Taman Safari Indonesia, Cisarua

Iran

 Dizin ski resort on the north mountains of Tehran at Gajereh region includes three gondola lifts. The lowest point of the region is 2650 m, while its highest point is 3600m above the sea level.
 The Pooladkaf gondola lift in Pooladkaf ski resort, near Sepidan, on the north mountains of Shiraz at Fars region. Elevation of this lift is from 2810 to 3231 meters from sea level.
 The Tochal gondola lift (Tele-cabin) from metropolitan Tehran to the Tochal Ski Resort
 Namak Abrud gondola lift in Mazandaran Province in northern Iran. It cuts through a lush forest and connects the Alborz, one of the highest summits in the region, to the villa city on the coast of the Caspian Sea.
 Lahijan Cable Car in the Gilan province
 Eynali Cable in the north of Tabriz.

Israel
 Kibbutz Manara cliff cable cars, Upper Galilee - a vital connection to the valley below. It lifts people from Kiryat Shmona to Kibbutz Manara at the top of Manara Cliff.

Kazakhstan 

 The Medeu - Shymbulak gondola links the sports complex Medeu and the ski resort Shymbulak in Almaty.

Japan

Among 170 aerial lifts in Japan, 97 lines are gondola lifts, including 3 funitels. 65 gondola lifts operate full season. See the above article for the full listing of aerial lifts in the country (including aerial tramways). Gondola lifts with English articles include:
 Dragondola, Naeba, Yuzawa, Niigata, is the longest aerial lift in Japan (5.5 km), as well as the fastest gondola lift in the country (6 m/s)
SP Gondola, Takasu Snow Park, Gujō, Gifu, also runs at 6 m/s
 Gozaisho Ropeway, Komono, Mie
 Katsuragiyama Ropeway, Izunokuni, Shizuoka
 Nikkō Shiranesan Ropeway, Katashina, Gunma
 Rusutsu Resort, Rusutsu, Hokkaidō
 Shin-Kōbe Ropeway, Kōbe, Hyōgo
 Sky Safari, Himeji Central Park, Himeji, Hyōgo
Yokohama Air Cabin; Yokohama, Kanagawa

Lebanon
 The Teleferique connects the bay of Jounieh, a city 16 km north of the capital Beirut, to Harissa's Our Lady of Lebanon pilgrimage monument at about 650 meters above sea level. It is 1,570 meters long and travels at 3.15 meters/second. It holds an exceptional view to the Mediterranean, as well as a dense pine forest.

Macau
 Cable Guia
 Wynn Palace - The gondola lifts are an attraction within the hotel complex.

Malaysia
Genting Skyway, connecting Gohtong Jaya to the hilltop resort of Genting Highlands, is one of the fastest gondola lift in Asia (6 m/s), and was the longest cable car in Southeast Asia
Awana Skyway, connecting Awana Transport Hub, Chin Swee Temple and SkyAvenue in Genting Highlands, they are among the strongest monocable gondola installations in the world

Langkawi Cable Car connects to Gunung Mat Cincang in the Langkawi Archipelago; this system has the longest free span for a mono-cable car at 950 m (3,120 ft) as well as one of the world’s steepest with a 42° gradient.

Nepal
 Manakamana Cable Car - Access to the very religiously regarded remote Manakamana Temple
 Chandragiri Cable Car from Thankot to Chandragiri hills.
 Kalinchowk Bhagwati Temple Cable car - Operates from Kuri village in Dolakha District to the temple on the hill nearby.
 Annapurna Cable Car - Operates from Lakeside in Pokhara to Sarangkot.

Pakistan
 Ayubia National Park gondola lift

Saudi Arabia
 A lift in the Sooda Region and one over the Abha city

Singapore
 The Singapore Cable Car from Mount Faber to Sentosa Island; interesting in that it has an intermediate stop in a highrise building.

South Korea
Muju Resort
Yongpyong Ski Resort
High1 Resort

Taiwan

 Maokong Gondola, Taipei
 Formosan Aboriginal Culture Village Cable Car
 Hualien Ocean Park Gondola
 Sun Moon Lake Ropeway in Nantou County
 Wulai Gondola in New Taipei

Proposed
 Jiufen Cable Car

Vietnam

 Bà Nà Hills, Danang
 Chua Huong cableway
 Xuan Huong gondola, Đà Lạt
 Huong Tich gondola, Hà Tĩnh
 Nui Ba Den gondola, Tây Ninh
 Nui Lon gondola, Vung Tau
 Ta Cu cableway, Bình Thuận
 Yen Tu gondola, Yên Tử, Quảng Ninh

Europe

Albania
"Dajti Express", from Tirana to Mount Dajt

Andorra
 La Massana in Pal sector, Vallnord ski resort
 Els Orriols in Arinsal sector, Vallnord ski resort
 Soldeu in Soldeu sector, Grandvalira ski resort
 El Tarter in El Tarter sector, Grandvalira ski resort
 Canillo in Canillo sector, Grandvalira ski resort

Austria
More than 90 Austrian ski resorts have gondola lifts for eight or more passengers, with more than 270 individual lifts in operation.

Azerbaijan
 Zaqatala
 Shahdag Mountain Resort
  Tufan Dag

Bulgaria
Poma, Borovetz - Rila mntn
Poma, Kartala - Rila mntn
Doppelmayr, Sofia - Vitosha mntn
Doppelmayr, Bansko - Pirin mntn

Bosnia and Herzegovina
Sarajevo Cable Car

Croatia
 Dubrovnik, to the top of the Srđ mountain
 Zagreb, 4.01 km line from the city to the top of the mount (closed since 2007) Sljeme

Finland
 Levi 2000 in Levi Ski Resort, year of construction 1999, route 1.41 km.
 Levi Express in Levi Ski Resort, year of construction 2007
 Ylläs 1 in Ylläs Ski Resort, year of construction 2007, route 2.01 km.

France
 Luchon Superbagnères

Georgia
 Rike Park - Narikala, Tbilisi
 Freedom Square - Sololaki, Tbilisi
 Sololaki - Tabori, Tbilisi
 Argo, Batumi
 GoodAura, Gudauri
 Goodauri - Bidara - Pass Gudauri
 Pass - Kobi Gudauri
 Zanka, Goderdzi
 Nodo, Bakuriani

Germany

 Bad Dürkheim lift (shut down)
 IGA Cable Car, Berlin
 Bode Valley Gondola Lift, Thale, Lower Saxony
 Cologne Cable Car, Cologne
 Koblenz Cable Car, Koblenz, Germany's largest aerial lift
 Schauinslandbahn
 Wurmberg Gondola Lift, Braunlage
 Seilbahn Rüdesheim am Rhein, Hessen

Greece
Santorini cable car in Santorini island

Italy
 Bormio
 Aprica
 Livigno
 Santa Caterina Valfurva
 Passo Del Tonale

North Macedonia
 Skopje

Norway
 Tromsø - Fjellheisen - Tourist lift
Åndalsnes - Romsdalsgondolen - Tourist lift, the longest in Norway opened in 2021.

Poland
 Bielsko-Biała - Szyndzielnia - Ski gondola

 Elka cableway (pol. Kolej linowa „Elka”) in Silesian Park in Chorzów and Katowice.
 Krynica-Zdrój - Jaworzyna Krynicka - Ski gondola
 Świeradów-Zdrój - Stóg Izerski - Ski gondola

Portugal
 Madeira - Funchal Cable Car - Tourist lift
 Lisbon - Telecabine Lisboa - Tourist lift
 Guimarães - Teleferico de Guimarães

Romania
Constanţa - Mamaia - Summer seaside gondola.
Piatra Neamţ - Tourist/ski gondola.
Poiana Braşov - Ski gondola.
Azuga - Ski gondola.
Sinaia - Tourist/Ski gondola.(2 cable cars 1000-1400, 1400-2000)
Vulcan, Hunedoara - Ski gondola.
Straja, Hunedoara - Ski gondola
Campulung Moldovesnesc, Suceava - Ski Gondola.
Transalpina ski resort - Ski Gondola.(2 ropeways connected via a middle station, due to problems regarding the power grid usually the second ropeway doesn't work)

Russia
 Nizhny Novgorod - Nizhny Novgorod Cable Car, intercity gondola lift.
 Moscow - Moskva River Cable Car.

Serbia
Stara Planina - Jabučko ravnište
Zlatibor - Zlatibor Gold Gondola (longest in the world at 9 km)
Kopaonik - Brzeće - Mali Karaman

Slovenia
Kanin Cable Car in Bovec is the longest gondola lift in Slovenia. It takes skiers from the Bovec valley (436 m) to the central part of the ski slopes (2,200 m).
Vogel Cable Car in Bohinj
Velika Planina Cable Car in Kamniška Bistrica valley (supposedly longest unsupported cable car in Europe)

Spain
Baqueira-Beret - Ski lift
Barcelona - Montjuïc Cable Car
Formigal - Ski lift, dismantled in 2004.
La Pinilla - Ski lift
Panticosa-Los Lagos - Ski lift.
Sierra Nevada - Ski lift.
 - Tourist lift on the Costa Del Sol
 - Pulsed gondola lift at Vall de Núria, Catalonia.
Teleférico de Madrid in Madrid, Community of Madrid. From Parque del Oeste to Casa de Campo.
 Vall de Núria telecabina - six-person cars in two sets of four each.

Sweden

Branäs - Ski lift.
Åre - Olympiagondolen - Ski lift.
Kläppen - Ski lift.

Switzerland

More than 40 Swiss ski resorts have gondola lifts for eight or more passengers, with more than 100 individual lifts in operation. Notable lifts include:

Gondelbahn Grindelwald-Männlichen is a 6071m tram with a journey time of 30 minutes.
Seilbahnen Beatenberg-Niederhorn, from Beatenberg to the summit of the Niederhorn

Turkey

Listed in the order of opening year.
 Balçova Gondola, İzmir (1974)
 Maçka Gondola, Istanbul line TF1 (1993)
 Eyüp Gondola, Istanbul line TF2 (2005)
 Samsun Amisos Hill Gondola, Samsun (2006)
 Keçiören Gondola, Ankara (2008)
 Aydın Pınarbaşı-Aytepe Gondola, Aydın (2009)
 Erciyes Lifos Gondola, Kayseri Province (2010s)
 Erciyes Tekir Gondola, Kayseri Province (2010s)
 Bergama Acropolis Gondola, İzmir Province (2010)
 Palandöken Gondola, Erzurum Province (2011)
 Şahinbey Park Gondola, Gaziantep (2011)
 Ordu Boztepe Gondola, Ordu (2012)
 Bursa Uludağ Gondola, Bursa Province (2013)
 Yenimahalle-Şentepe Gondola, Ankara (2014)
 Denizli Gondola, Denizli (2015)
 Tünektepe Gondola, Antalya (2017)
 Alanya Gondola, Alanya (2017)

United Kingdom
 Alton Towers Theme Park, Staffordshire
 IFS Cloud Cable Car, crossing the Thames at Greenwich, London
 Llandudno Cable Car, connecting the Great Orme to Llandudno in Wales
 Heights of Abraham Cable Car, Matlock Bath, Derbyshire,
 Nevis Range Ski Area, Fort William, Scotland

North America

Canada

Alberta:
 Grizzly Express Gondola at Lake Louise Ski Area, Alberta (6 Person Gondola)
 Sulphur Mountain Gondola in Banff, Alberta (4 Person Bi-Cable Gondola)
 Sunshine Village Gondola near Banff, Alberta (8 Person, Triple Stage Gondola)

British Columbia:

 Sea to Sky Gondola at Squamish, British Columbia
 Lara's Gondola at Big White Ski Resort near Kelowna, British Columbia (8 Person Gondola)
 Whistler Village Express Gondola at Whistler Blackcomb, British Columbia (9 Person [8 sitting, one standing], Double Stage Gondola)
 Blackcomb Gondola at Whistler Blackcomb, British Columbia (10 Person, Double Stage Gondola)
 Excalibur Gondola at Whistler Blackcomb, British Columbia (8 Person, Double Stage Gondola)
 Creekside Gondola at Whistler Blackcomb, British Columbia (6 Person Gondola)
 Peak 2 Peak Gondola at Whistler Blackcomb, British Columbia (28 Person Tri-Cable Gondola)
 Kadenwood Gondola at Whistler Blackcomb, British Columbia  (8 Person Pulse Gondola)
 Golden Eagle Express Gondola at Kicking Horse Resort, British Columbia (8 Person Gondola)
 Village Gondola at Panorama Ski Resort, British Columbia (8 Person Open-Air Pulse Gondola)
 Revelation Gondola at Revelstoke Mountain Resort near Revelstoke, British Columbia (8 Person, Double Stage Gondola)
 Burnaby Mountain Gondola in Burnaby, British Columbia  (future)

Ontario:
 Village Gondola at Blue Mountain, Ontario (6 Person Open-Air Gondola) Summer Only. In the winter it is converted to a High Speed Six Person Chairlift.

Quebec:
 Télécabine Express at Mont Tremblant Resort, Québec (8 Person Gondola)
 Cabriolet at Mont Tremblant Resort, Québec (6 Person Open-Air Gondola)
 L'Étoile Filante at Mont Sainte-Anne, Québec (8 Person Gondola)
L'Express du Village at Ski Bromont, Quebec (6 Person Chairlift/ 8 Person Gondola Combination)
 L'Hybride at Mount Orford in Magog, Quebec (6 Person Chairlift/ 8 Person Gondola Combination)
 Massif Express at Le Massif, Québec (8 Person, Double Stage Gondola)
 Le Téléphérique at Montmorency Falls, Quebec (30 Person Standing Gondola)
Nova Scotia:
Atlantic Gondola at Ski Cape Smokey, Nova Scotia (8 Person Gondola)

Costa Rica
A pulsed gondola provides access to a canopy walkway and other attractions in the Monteverde Cloud Forest Reserve.

Guatemala
 Teleférico de Amatitlán in Amatitlán

Mexico
 Cablebús, a public transport system cable car in  Mexico City.
 Mexicable, a public transport system cable car in the State of Mexico.
 Teleférico de Zacatecas, a tourist cable car in Zacatecas City, renovated and opened in 2018.

Dominican Republic
 Teleférico de Santo Domingo, a public transport system cable car in  Santo Domingo.
 Teleférico de Puerto Plata, a tourist cable car in  Puerto Plata.

United States

Ski resort gondolas
Arizona:
Arizona Snowbowl
Arizona Gondola
California:
 Heavenly
 Heavenly Gondola
 Mammoth Mountain
 Panorama Gondola
 Village Gondola
 Northstar California
 Big Springs Gondola
 Highlands Gondola (Pulse Gondola)
 Sugar Bowl
 Village Gondola
Colorado:
 Aspen
 Silver Queen Gondola
 Beaver Creek
 Haymeadow Express Gondola
 Riverfront Express Gondola
 Breckenridge
 BreckConnect Gondola
 Cañon City
 Royal Gorge Aerial Gondola
 Keystone
 River Run Gondola
 Outpost Gondola
 Snowmass
 Elk Camp
 Sky Cab (Pulse Gondola, Cabriolet)
 Steamboat
 Silver Bullet Gondola (first 8-passenger gondola in the world)
 Wild Blue Gondola
 Telluride
 Mountain Village Gondola
 Vail
 Eagle Bahn Gondola
 Gondola One
 Winter Park
 The Gondola
 Village Cabriolet (Cabriolet)
Idaho:
 Silver Mountain
 Gondola
 Sun Valley - Bald Mountain
 Roundhouse Gondola
Minnesota:
 Lutsen Mountains
 Gondola
Montana:
 Yellowstone Club
 Eglise Gondola
New Hampshire:
 Bretton Woods
 Bretton Woods Skyway
 Loon Mountain
 Gondola
New Jersey:
 Mountain Creek
 The Cabriolet (Cabriolet)
New Mexico:
 Ski Apache
 The Apache Windrider ( only ski access Gondola in NM )
 Taos
 Gondolita (Pulse Gondola)
New York:
 Belleayre
 Catskill Thunder
 Gore Mountain
 Northwoods Gondola
 Whiteface
 Cloudsplitter Gondola
Utah:
 Deer Valley
 Jordanelle Express Gondola
 Park City
 Cabriolet Gondola (Cabriolet)
 Frostwood Gondola (Pulse Gondola)
 Quicksilver Gondola
 Red Pine Gondola
 Snowbasin
 Needles Express Gondola
 Strawberry Express Gondola
Vermont:
 Killington
 K-1 Express Gondola
 Skyeship Express Gondola
 Stowe
 Gondola
 Over Easy Gondola
 Stratton
 Summit Gondola
Washington:
 Crystal Mountain
 Mount Rainier Gondola
Wyoming:
 Jackson Hole
 Bridger Gondola
 Sweetwater Gondola

Other gondolas
California
 Bayside Skyride, SeaWorld San Diego, San Diego
 Skyfari, San Diego Zoo, San Diego
 Skytrail (pulse gondola), Trees of Mystery, Klamath
 Skyway, Disneyland, Anaheim (first in U.S.; closed in 1994)
 Sterling Vineyards, Calistoga
Colorado
 Glenwood Caverns Adventure Park Gondola, Glenwood Springs
 Fun House Express (pulse gondola), Water World, Colorado, Federal Heights
 Royal Gorge Gondola, Royal Gorge Bridge, Cañon City
Florida
 Bud Light Seltzer Skyview, Hard Rock Stadium, Miami Gardens
 Disney Skyliner, Walt Disney World, Orlando
 Skyride, Busch Gardens Tampa Bay, Tampa
Indiana
 Skyline, Indianapolis Zoo, Indianapolis
Louisiana
 Mississippi Aerial River Transit (dismantled in 1994), New Orleans
Minnesota
 Skyride, Minnesota State Fair, Falcon Heights
New Hampshire
 Wildcat Gondola Skyride, Wildcat Mountain Ski Area, Jackson (this gondola is converted to a quad chair-lift for skiing in the winter)
New Jersy
 Skyway, Six Flags Great Adventure, Jackson
New York
 Skyfari, Bronx Zoo, New York City (removed in 2008)
Oregon
 Wallowa Lake Tramway, Wallowa–Whitman National Forest, Joseph
Texas
 Texas Skyway, Fair Park, Dallas
Washington
 Skyride, Riverfront Park, Spokane
West Virginia
 Pipestem Resort State Park, Pipestem

Oceania

Australia
 Arthurs Seat, Victoria. The Eagle opened on 3 December 2016. Made by Doppelmayr.
 Taronga Park Zoo, Sydney
 Skyrail Rainforest Cableway, Cairns
 Horse Hill Lift, Mount Buller, Victoria †
 Kosciusko Express lift, Thredbo, New South Wales †
 Merritts Gondola, Thredbo, New South Wales (Opening 2020)

† Note: Horse Hill and Kosciusko Express are combined lifts (or 'chondolas') where gondolas and four seat detachable chairs can be added to a cable according to demand.

A complete list of all 400 Australian aerial and ski lifts. It includes a dozen gondolas.

New Zealand
 Skyline Gondola, Queenstown
 Skyline Gondola, Mt Ngongotahā, Rotorua
 Christchurch Gondola, Heathcote Valley, Port Hills
 Skywaka Gondola, Whakapapa ski field, Mt Ruapehu
 All lifts at the list of New Zealand ski lifts

South America

Argentina
 "Telecabina" (Chapelco Ski resort)
 Aerogondolas (Skyride), Parque de la Ciudad Theme Park, Buenos Aires, Argentina
 "Telecabina Amancay", Cerro Catedral Ski Resort, San Carlos de Bariloche
 "Telecabina Jean Pierre", Cerro Bayo Ski Resort, Villa La Angostura
 "Teleférico San Bernardo", Salta, Argentina

Bolivia
Mi Teleférico (La Paz). First three lines opened in 2014, six more lines are being planned. At  in length, Phase One (the first three lines) was considered to be the longest aerial cable car system in the world upon its completion in 2014.

Brazil
 Teleférico do Alemão, a cable car servicing the Complexo do Alemão favela in Rio de Janeiro.
 Teleférico da Providência, a cable car servicing the Providência neighbourhood in Rio de Janeiro. Has not operated since 2016
 "Bondinho Parque Unipraias", a tourist cable car in Balneário Camboriú, Santa Catarina.
 "Bondinhos Aéreos Parque da Serra", a tourist cable car in Canela, Rio Grande do Sul.
 "Bontur Bondinhos Aéreos", a tourist cable car in Aparecida, São Paulo.

Chile
 Santiago Cable Car. In Santiago, a tramway was open on April 1, 1980, in San Cristóbal Hill. With 72 cabins moving at 4 meters per second, its biggest tower is 124.6 ft (38 m) tall, and the smallest 26.2 ft (8 m). The Teleférico de Santiago has 12 towers and takes almost 20 minutes to cover the 3 miles (4860 m) route, powered by a 100 hp engine.

Colombia
Gondola lift at the Colombian Coffee Park
In the Colombian National Coffee Park in Montenegro, department of Quindío, there is a tourist tramway hovering over the park.
 Metrocable is an urban public transit system serving the steep areas of Medellín.  The system is interconnected with the metropolitan train system, Metro de Medellín.
In the Chicamocha National Park (Santander), there is a tourist cable car system connecting the "Panachi" station with the town of "Meseta de los Santos", across the Chicamocha Canyon. Total length of 6.3 km.

Ecuador
 Aerovia (Guayaquil) in Guayaquil. Gondola lift.
 Telefériqo in Quito. Gondola lift.

Venezuela
 Metrocable is an urban public transit system in Caracas.
 Teleférico de Caracas ascends El Ávila Mountain within El Ávila National Park, in Caracas

See also
List of aerial tramways
List of spans
Funitel

References

Vertical transport devices
Ski lifts